Kangaré-Foulbé is a village in the Rollo Department of Bam Province in northern Burkina Faso. It has a population of 270.

References

Populated places in the Centre-Nord Region
Bam Province